Dmitry Lvovich Bykov (born 20 December 1967) is a Russian writer, poet, literary critic and journalist. He is also known as biographer of Boris Pasternak, Bulat Okudzhava and Maxim Gorky.

Biography
Born into a Jewish family, his father was a prominent medical scholar Leva Zilbertrud.

Bykov graduated from the Faculty of Journalism of the elite Moscow State University. Dmitry Bykov taught literature and the history of Soviet literature in Moscow's secondary schools. He was a professor at the Department of World Literature and Culture of MGIMO, often considered the most elite university of the USSR. As a journalist and critic, Bykov has been writing for the magazine Ogoniok since 1993. He has also periodically hosted a show on the radio station Echo of Moscow, which ran until 2008. Earlier, he was one of the hosts of an influential TV show Vremechko.

Being one of the most prolific modern Russian writers, in recent years he has gained additional recognition for his biography of Boris Pasternak, published in 2005. The biography earned Bykov the 2006 National Bestseller and Big Book awards. He later wrote biographies of Maxim Gorky and Bulat Okudzhava.

In 2008 a documentary called Virginity was released in which Bykov was a co-writer.

In 2009, Bykov was named assistant editor-in-chief of the weekly magazine Profile. He is also the editor-in-chief of the monthly literature-focused magazine What to Read.

Together with actor Mikhail Yefremov, he created project "Citizen Poet" (a pun on Nikolay Nekrasov's poem "Poet and Citizen"). Yefremov reads poems, written by Bykov, which are usually satirical comments on contemporary Russian society, politics and culture. Each poem parodies the style of a famous poet of the past, e.g. Pushkin, Nekrasov, Kipling, among others. It was originally broadcast on Dozhd TV channel, but the project was closed because the poems were too critical of the Russian government. Currently, the show is hosted in audio format by Echo of Moscow radio station.

In mid-April 2019, while aboard a domestic flight en route to Ufa, Bykov fainted and was hospitalized upon arrival. Initially, Russian media covered the story regarding Bykov's health status in different ways. Reports that he suffered a stroke were denied by Bykov’s friend Alexei Venediktov. Instead, Echo of Moscow reported that a chronic illness was responsible for Bykov’s condition, which was specified by online portal Otkrytye Media as being diabetes, and that Bykov suffering from a hyperglycemic crisis. In addition, a source told RIA Novosti that Bykov had experienced severe circulatory failures in his brain.

However, the next week, on 25 April, Bykov denied having diabetes. After the doctors at the hospital in Ufa told him that they could not find the cause of his illness, he concluded that it was poisoning. In early September 2020, Aric Toler, director of research and training at Bellingcat, suspected that a nerve poison was used. The possible poisoning of Bykov by Russian government agents was reportedly investigated, along with other similar cases, by Christo Grozev of Bellingcat. Bellingcat describes a "striking resemblance" between the poisoning of Bykov and the poisoning of Alexei Navalny.

Bibliography

Prose fiction
 Justification («Оправдание», 2001)
 Orthography («Орфография», 2003)
 In the World of Animals: A Children's Book for Adults, An Adults' Book for Children, with Irina Luk'ianova («В мире животиков. Детская книга для взрослых, взрослая книга для детей», 2005)
 How Putin Became President of the USA: New Russian Fairy Tales («Как Путин стал президентом США: новые русские сказки», 2005)
 Truth, with Maksim Chertanov («Правда», 2005)
 Removal Service («Эвакуатор», 2005)
 ZhD («ЖД», 2006)
 ZhD Short Stories («ЖД-рассказы», 2007)
 Listed out («Списанные», 2008)
 Ostromov, or The Magician's Apprentice («Остромов, или Ученик чародея», 2010)
 Farewell to the Cuckoo («Прощай, кукушка», 2011)
 Male Carriage («Мужской вагон», 2012)
 X («Икс», 2012)
 The Signals, with Valeria Zharova («Сигналы», 2013)
 The Block: A Walktrough («Квартал: прохождение», 2014)

Biographies
 Boris Pasternak («Борис Пастернак», 2005)
 Was Gorky real? («Был ли Горький?», 2008)
 Bulat Okudzhava («Булат Окуджава», 2009)

Books of essays
 The Debauchery of Work («Блуд труда», 2003)
 Chronicles of Immediate War («Хроники ближайшей войны», 2005)
 In Place of Life («Вместо жизни», 2006)
 In a Void («На пустом месте», 2008)
 Thinking the World («Думание мира», 2009)
 And Practically Everybody («И все-все-все», 2009, 2011)
 The Calendar. Speaking of Essential Things («Календарь. Разговоры о главном», 2010)
 The Calendar 2. Debating the Undebatable («Календарь-2. Споры о бесспорном», 2012)
 The Secret Russian Calendar. Most important dates(«Тайный русский календарь. Главные даты», 2012)
 The Short Course of Soviet Literature («Советская литература. Краткий курс», 2012). later republished as The Advanced Course of Soviet Literature («Советская литература. Расширенный курс»)

Poetry
Declaration of Independence («Декларация независимости», 1992)
A Letter to a Young Man («Послание к юноше», 1994)
Military Coup («Военный переворот», 1996)
Reprieve («Отсрочка», 2000)
The Recruit («Призывник», 2003)
Chain Letters («Письма счастья», 2006)
Last Time («Последнее время», 2007)
The Report («Отчет», 2010)
New Chain Letters («Новые письма счастья», 2010)
Actually («На самом деле», 2011)
New and Newest Chain Letters («Новые и новейшие письма счастья», 2012)
Bliss («Блаженство», 2014)

Drama
The Bear («Медведь», 2010)

References 

1967 births
Living people
Moscow State University alumni
Russian film critics
Russian journalists
Russian male poets
Russian writers
TV Rain
2011–2013 Russian protests
Russian biographers
Male biographers
Russian columnists
Russian YouTubers
Russian schoolteachers
Echo of Moscow radio presenters
Russian activists against the 2022 Russian invasion of Ukraine
People listed in Russia as media foreign agents